Liman is a moshav in northern Israel. Its area is about 2400 dunams and most residents work in agriculture, including chicken raising.

History
The village was founded in 1949 by a group of demobilized soldiers on part of the lands of the depopulated  Palestinian village of al-Bassa. It was originally called Tzahal, but was later renamed "Liman" to honor the American senator Herbert H. Lehman.

A 3rd century painted tomb from the Roman period was discovered in the fields of Liman in 1994–1995. The tomb contained two skeletons, bottles, coins and pottery.

References

External links
Liman Association for the Development of the Galilee

Moshavim
Populated places in Northern District (Israel)
Populated places established in 1949
1949 establishments in Israel